Denis Joseph McKey (13 March 1910 – 7 November 1982) was an Australian rules footballer who played with St Kilda in the Victorian Football League (VFL).

Notes

External links 

1910 births
1982 deaths
Australian rules footballers from Victoria (Australia)
St Kilda Football Club players
Stawell Football Club players